The 1952–53 Montreal Canadiens season was the Canadiens' 44th season of play. The Canadiens placed second in the regular season, defeated the Chicago Black Hawks in the semi-final and the Boston Bruins in the final to win the club's seventh Stanley Cup championship.

Regular season

Final standings

Record vs. opponents

Schedule and results

Playoffs

Stanley Cup Finals

Montreal wins best-of-seven series 4 games to 1

Player statistics

Regular season
Scoring

Goaltending

Playoffs
Scoring

Goaltending

Awards and records

Awards

All-Star teams

Transactions
The following is a list of all transactions that have occurred for the Montreal Canadiens during the 1952–53 NHL season. It lists which team each player has been traded to and for which player(s) or other consideration(s), if applicable.

See also
 1952–53 NHL season

References
Canadiens on Hockey Database
Canadiens on NHL Reference

Stanley Cup championship seasons
Montreal Canadiens seasons
Mon
Mon